The Mountains of Central Asia are a biodiversity hot spot designated by Conservation International which covers several montane and alpine ecoregions of Central Asia, including those of the Pamir and Tian Shan ranges, and extending across portions of Afghanistan, China, Kazakhstan, Kyrgyzstan, Tajikistan, Uzbekistan and the Karakoram range in China, Pakistan and India. The Karakoram range is also famously known for Karakoram Anomaly that relates to the anomalous growth of glaciers in the central Karakoram that is in contrast with melting glaciers in other mountainous ranges of Himalayas and other parts of the world due to the effects of climate change.

The hotspot encompasses several habitat types, including montane grasslands and shrublands, temperate coniferous forests, and alpine tundra. The ecoregions in the hotspot include:
 Alai-Western Tian Shan steppe
 Gissaro-Alai open woodlands
 Pamir alpine desert and tundra
 Tian Shan montane steppe and meadows
 Tian Shan montane conifer forests

References

External links
Mountains of Central Asia (Conservation International)
Mountains Central Asia Tien-Shan Mountains Kyrgyzstan Pamir

Ecoregions of Asia
Geography of Central Asia
Landforms of Central Asia
Palearctic ecoregions